Absence of fingerprints-congenital milia syndrome, also known simply as Baird syndrome is an extremely rare autosomal dominant genetic disorder which is characterized by a lack of fingerprints and the appearance of blisters and facial milia soon after birth. It has been described in ten families worldwide.

Presentation 

People with this disorder often have congenital adermatoglyphia, facial milia and blisters soon after birth, hypohidrosis (less sweating than average), and either thin or thickened skin throughout the body.

Single transversal palmar lines, plantar keratoderma, nail grooving, toe syndactyly and finger camptodactyly have also been reported. Rarely, constriction ring syndrome is reported.

Causes 

Through a large Han Chinese family with the disorder, it was found to be caused by mutations in the SMARCAD1 gene, in chromosome 4. This gene produces a protein that is believed to control genes associated with the development of the fingerprints.

References 

Genetic diseases and disorders